Faetano is one of the 9 communes or castelli of San Marino. It has 1,177 inhabitants (May 2018) in an area of 7.75 km2.

Geography
It borders the Sammarinese municipalities of Montegiardino, Fiorentino, Borgo Maggiore, and Domagnano and the Italian municipalities of Coriano, Montescudo and Sassofeltrio.

History

It was attached voluntarily to San Marino in 1463 in the last territorial expansion.

Parishes
Faetano has four parishes (curazie):
Cà Chiavello, Calligaria, Corianino, Monte Pulito

References

External links

 
Municipalities of San Marino
Italy–San Marino border crossings